Alireza Faghani (born 21 March 1978) is an Iranian  international football referee who has been officiating in the Persian Gulf Pro League for several seasons and has been on the FIFA list since 2008. Faghani has refereed important matches such as the 2014 AFC Champions League Final, the 2015 AFC Asian Cup Final, the 2015 FIFA Club World Cup Final, the 2016 Olympic football final match. He has refereed matches in the 2017 Liga 1, 2017 FIFA Confederations Cup, 2018 FIFA World Cup in Russia, 2019 AFC Asian Cup in UAE and the 2022 FIFA World Cup in Qatar. Alireza migrated to Australia to referee for Australia A-League in September 2019.

Early life 
He was born on 21 March 1978 in Kashmar, a city near Mashhad. His nickname is Behrooz. His father, Mohammad Faghani was also a football referee. He has a younger brother named Mohammadreza, who referees in Sweden.

Faghani was part of the youth team of Bank Melli, and also played for Shahab Khodro, Etka, and Niroye Zamini. He also played in Iran's League 2 which is the third tier in the Iranian football pyramid. However, in the end he decided to be a football referee.

Refereeing career 
Faghani became a FIFA referee in 2008, only a year after officiating in the top flight league in Iran. After becoming a FIFA referee Faghani has moved up the ladder really fast especially in Asia. After only one year of international experience Faghani took charge of the 2009 AFC President's Cup Final which was played between Regar-TadAZ Tursunzoda and Dordoi-Dynamo Naryn which was won 2–0 by the hosts. A year later he was again in charge of a final but this time it was a much more important final in the 2010 AFC Challenge Cup where the winner qualified for the 2011 AFC Asian Cup. He gave a red card to the North Korean defender in the 32nd minute but North Korea went on to defeat Turkmenistan in penalties.

He was named as the fourth referee for the opening match of the 2014 FIFA World Cup between Brazil and Croatia. He also refereed the 2014 AFC Champions League Final first leg match between Al-Hilal and Western Sydney Wanderers. He is also one of the officials of the 2015 AFC Asian Cup, refereeing his first match in Group B between Saudi Arabia and China that ended 0–1. Faghani awarded Saudi Arabia a penalty kick but Naif Hazazi missed it.

He was appointed to referee the 2015 AFC Asian Cup Final, which was contested by South Korea and Australia. Faghani was the referee in the 2015 FIFA Club World Cup Final between Club Atlético River Plate and FC Barcelona. He was also the referee in the 2016 Indian Super League Final between Kerala Blasters and ATK. Perhaps the most important match in which he was the main referee was the 2016 Olympic football final match between host Brazil and Germany.

Faghani was referee in six matches of the 2017 Liga 1 in Indonesia and two matches of the 2017 FIFA Confederations Cup in Russia.

Faghani was appointed to be a referee for the 2018 FIFA World Cup in Russia. After the conclusion of the round of 16, it was announced that Faghani was one of 17 referees who had been selected to be assigned matches for the remainder of the tournament.

He was also referee of the 2018 AFF Championship final between Vietnam – Malaysia in its 2nd leg. On 5 December 2018, it was announced that Faghani had been appointed to referee at the 2019 AFC Asian Cup in the United Arab Emirates.

In 2019 he and his family migrated from Iran to Australia, and he was subsequently signed on by the A-League to the full time match official panel.

On 4 January 2023, The FIFA website published the list of international referees, assistant referees and video assistant referees for all countries of the world, and Alireza Faghani's name is seen in the list of international referees of Australia for 2023 as one of the 12 main referees of this country.

Matches

FIFA World Cup

FIFA Confederations Cup

Summer Olympics

AFC Asian Cup

FIFA Club World Cup

Statistics 

Source: worldfootball.net

Honours 
Iranian Referee of the Year: 2011, 2015, 2017
Asian Referee of the Year: 2016, 2018

References

External links 

Alireza Faghani at RateTheRef.net
 
 
 
 

 Alireza Faghani

Iranian football referees
Living people
1978 births
2018 FIFA World Cup referees
2022 FIFA World Cup referees
FIFA World Cup referees
People from Kashmar
Football referees at the 2016 Summer Olympics
AFC Asian Cup referees
A-League Men referees